Jakub Yunis (born 25 March 1996) is a professional Czech football forward currently playing for Sigma Olomouc in the Czech First League.

Career
Sigma Olomouc coach Václav Jílek described him as a natural defensive forward. He made his league debut in Sigma's Czech National Football League 5–1 loss at Třinec on 1 August 2015. He made his first starting 11 appearance in October 2016, scoring two goals in a 2–1 comeback win at Vítkovice. 

In September 2015, he scored the winning goal in Czech Republic Under-20 national team's 1–0 victory against England.

References

External links 
 
 Jakub Yunis official international statistics
 
 Jakub Yunis profile on the SK Sigma Olomouc official website

Czech footballers
Czech Republic youth international footballers
1996 births
Living people
Czech First League players
SK Sigma Olomouc players
Association football forwards
Czech people of Iraqi descent
Czech expatriate footballers
Expatriate footballers in Poland
GKS Katowice players
Footballers from Brno